Piquer is a Spanish surname, and may refer to:

 Andrés Piquer (1711–1772), Spanish physician, philosopher, logician and writer
 Bernardo López Piquer (1799–1874), Spanish painter
 Concha Piquer (1908–1990), Spanish singer
 Francisco Piquer Chanza (1922–2009), Spanish actor
 Juan Piquer Simón (1935-2011), Spanish film director
 Vicente Piquer (1935-2018), Spanish retired footballer

See also
 Piqué (surname)

Spanish-language surnames